The  was a Japanese  ocean liner owned by Nippon Yusen Kaisha. The ship was built in 1941–1943 by Mitsubishi Shipbuilding & Engineering Co. at Nagasaki, Japan. The vessel was designed for passenger service, but the onset of war by the time work was completed changed requirements, and she was requisitioned by the Japanese Navy.

The ship's name came in part from the ancient province of Awa on the island of eastern Shikoku in the modern prefecture of Tokushima.  This mid-century Awa Maru was the second NYK vessel to bear this name.  A 6,309-ton Awa Maru was completed in 1899 and taken out of service in 1930.

History
The ship was built by Mitsubishi at Nagasaki on the southern island of Kyushu. The keel was laid down in the summer of 1941 (July 10, 1941).  The Awa Maru was launched on August 24, 1942; and she was completed on March 5, 1943.

Pacific War
The Awa Maru was requisitioned and refitted for auxiliary use by the Imperial Japanese Navy during World War II. On 26 March 1943, Awa Maru left Japan carrying 3,000 tons of ammunition for Singapore. Awa Maru traveled to Singapore with convoy Hi-3 in July 1943, and returned to Japan with convoy Hi-14 in November. She again traveled to Singapore with convoy Hi-41 in February 1944, and returned to Japan with convoy Hi-48 in March. She then transported troops to Burma with convoy Hi-63 in May, and returned to Japan with convoy Hi-66 in June.

Awa Maru was attached to convoy Hi-71 carrying Operation Shō reinforcements to the Philippines. Awa Maru was one of several ships torpedoed that night, but beached at Port Currimao to avoid sinking, and was towed to Manila on 21 August. Awa Maru was repaired in Singapore, and returned to Japan with convoy Hi-84 in January 1945.

Sinking 
In 1945 the Awa Maru was employed as a Red Cross relief ship, purportedly carrying vital supplies to American and Allied prisoners of war (POWs) in Japanese custody. Under the Relief for POWs agreement, she was supposed to be given safe passage by Allied forces, and Allied commanders issued orders to that effect.

Having delivered her supplies, Awa Maru took on several hundred stranded merchant marine officers, military personnel, diplomats and civilians at Singapore. Less dramatic and more credible sources identify the likely cargo as nickel and rubber. The ship was observed in Singapore being loaded with a cargo of rice in sacks; however, that evening the docks were reportedly cleared and troops were brought in to first unload the rice and then re-load her with contraband.

Her voyage also corresponded with the last possible location of the fossil remains of Peking Man, which were in Singapore at the time and were, on their own, priceless in value. There are various theories regarding the disappearance of a number of Peking Man fossils during World War II; one such theory is that the bones sank with the Awa Maru in 1945.

The ship departed Singapore on March 28, but on April 1 was intercepted late at night in the Taiwan Strait by the American submarine , which mistook her for a destroyer.  The Awa Maru had been guaranteed safe passage as a relief ship carrying Red Cross supplies to prisoner of war camps. Under the agreed rules, she disclosed to the Allies the route she would take back to Japan. Her original route was promulgated through a minefield, an apparent ruse to draw attackers into the mined area. The area was known to be mined, and would have been avoided at any rate.  Her final route avoided the mines.
 
The torpedoes of the Queenfish sank the ship. Only one of the 2,004 passengers and crew, Kantora Shimoda, survived. He was the captain's personal steward, and it was the third time in which he was the sole survivor of a torpedoed ship. As the Awa Maru sank "she was carrying a cargo of rubber, lead, tin, and sugar. Seventeen hundred merchant seamen and 80 first-class passengers, all survivors of ship sinkings, were being transported from Singapore to Japan.…[The] survivor said no Red Cross supplies were aboard, they having been previously unloaded."

Aftermath

Commander Loughlin was found guilty of negligence, and the U.S. Government offered, via neutral Switzerland, to replace the Awa Maru with a similar ship. Japan demanded full indemnification. On the very day of Japan's surrender, 14 August 1945, Foreign Minister Togo forwarded a message to the United States through Bern, Switzerland, demanding payment of 196,115,000 yen ($45 million) for the loss of 2,003 lives; 30,370,000 yen ($7.25 million) for the goods aboard the Awa Maru; and various other claims, for a total demand of 227,286,600 yen or approximately $52.5 million.…No gold bullion is mentioned in the message.The Japanese bill was never paid, and in 1949 the matter was closed.

In 1980, the People's Republic of China launched one of the biggest salvage efforts on a single ship in history. They had successfully located and identified the wreck site in 1977 and were convinced that the vessel was carrying billions in gold and jewels. After approximately 5 years and $100 million spent on the effort, the search was finally called off. No treasure was found. However, several personal artifacts were returned to Japan.

In the aftermath of the salvage attempt, the NSA scoured thousands of intercepted communications to determine what exactly happened to the treasure. From the communications, they determined that the treasure was not to be taken back to Japan. It was to be sent from Japan to Singapore where it would then be delivered to Thailand. The gold was successfully delivered and the Awa Maru was reloaded with a cargo of tin and rubber for the return trip to Japan.

See also
 Yasukuni Shrine
 List by death toll of ships sunk by submarines
 List of battles and other violent events by death toll
 MV Wilhelm Gustloff

Notes

References
 Dingman, Roger. (1997).  Ghost of War: The Sinking of the Awa Maru and Japanese-American Relations, 1945-1995. Annapolis: Naval Institute Press. ;  OCLC  37315278
 Gibney, Frank and Beth Cary. (2006).  Sensō: the Japanese remember the Pacific War : letters to the editor of Asahi Shimbun. Armonk, New York: M.E. Sharpe. ; 
 Harper, Dale P. (2001). Too Close for Comfort. Trafford Publishing. 

 Ponsonby-Fane, Richard Arthur Brabazon. (1935).  The Nomenclature of the N.Y.K. Fleet. Tokyo: Nippon Yusen Kaisha.  OCLC 27933596
 Seagrave, Sterling and Peggy Seagrave. (2003).   Gold warriors: America's secret recovery of Yamashita's gold.  London: Verso. ;  OCLC 54612143 
 Sasgen, Peter T. (2005).  Red Scorpion: The War Patrols of the USS Rasher. New York: Simon & Schuster. 
 Tate, E. Mowbray. (1986).  Transpacific steam: the story of steam navigation from the Pacific Coast of North America to the Far East and the Antipodes, 1867-1941. New York: Cornwall Books. ; 
 U.S. Bureau of Manufactures, Bureau of Foreign Commerce. (1905).  Monthly consular and trade reports (1854-1903). Washington, D.C.:  Superintendent of Documents, U.S. Government Printing Office.  
 U.S. Department of State. (1968).  Treaties and Other International Agreements of the United States of America 1776-1949. Washington: Superintendent of Documents, U.S. Government Printing Office.

External links
US Department of State:  "Agreement and agreed terms of understanding signed at Tokyo April 14, 1949."
 http://www.combinedfleet.com/Awa_t.htm Tabular record of movement
 says 
 USS Queenfish (SS-393) (position apparently from http://www.pigboats.com/ww2/queenfish.html)
 says 
 NSA chart
 says 
 https://web.archive.org/web/20050716083513/http://www.subnet.com/fleet/ss393.htm
 http://issuu.com/hnsa/docs/ss-393_queenfish

1942 ships
Hospital ships in World War II
Ships of the NYK Line
Steamships of Japan
Ocean liners
Shipwrecks in the Taiwan Strait
World War II shipwrecks in the Pacific Ocean
World War II merchant ships of Japan
Ships sunk by American submarines
Maritime incidents in April 1945
Japanese hell ships
War crimes by the United States during World War II

ja:阿波丸事件